Dor is a rural locality (a village) in Krasnopolyanskoye Rural Settlement, Nikolsky District, Vologda Oblast, Russia. The population was 141 as of 2002.

Geography 
The distance to Nikolsk is 10 km. Kuznechikha is the nearest rural locality.

References 

Rural localities in Nikolsky District, Vologda Oblast